Jack Harper (born September 9, 1967) was a Republican member of the Arizona Senate and the Arizona House of Representatives, representing Arizona Legislative District 4.  He served in the Senate from January 2003 until January 2011, and in the House from January 2011 until January 2013.

References

Republican Party members of the Arizona House of Representatives
Republican Party Arizona state senators
1967 births
Living people